L3Harris Commercial Aviation Solutions (L3 CTS) is a flight training provider and manufacturer of civil flight simulators based in Crawley, England. It is part of L3Harris, and was formed as L-3 Link Simulation & Training UK in 2012, when L3 acquired the civil fixed-wing simulation division of Thales Training & Simulation (TTS).

History 
L3 CTS was incorporated in 2006 as "L-3 Communications Group Limited", acting as holding company for the L-3 group in the United Kingdom. In 2012, when TTS was partially acquired, the company's name was changed to "L-3 Communications Link Simulation and Training UK Limited" (L-3 Link UK).

In May 2015, the subsidiary L-3 CTC was formed, following the acquisition of British flight training provider CTC aviation, and in July 2016, L-3 Link UK and L-3 CTC were consolidated into L3 Commercial Training Solutions.

L3 CTS and TTS are still co-located on the same site in Manor Royal, Crawley, and share the same ancestry, rooted in the US simulation business created by Ed Link in the 1930s and in the British simulator manufacturer Redifon (later Rediffusion).

Recently, L3 Airline Academy has been granted the contract to train the RAF (Royal Air Forces) Multi Engine Aircraft pilots.

Products and services 
L3 CTS's  core product is the RealitySeven line of full flight simulators, which covers a wide range of aircraft types: from turboprop ATR72 to single-aisle Embraer E2, A320, Boeing 737 and wide-bodies Boeing 747, Boeing 767, Boeing 777, Boeing 787 and Airbus A330, A350 and Airbus A380.

A major part of the business is also the provision of flight training services, including cadet selection, ab initio training and airline training, both in the UK and in Bangkok, Thailand, through the controlled Asian Aviation Training Center, which was acquired as part of the TTS deal.

References

External links
Company website

Companies based in Crawley
Flight training in the United Kingdom
L3Harris Technologies